Huatu yuan, also translated into English as A Destiny in Two Paintings, is a classic Chinese novel that was published in the late 17th-century during the early Qing dynasty. A romantic novel in the caizi jiaren genre, it was written by Buyue Zhuren (步月主人), a writer under a pseudonym.

Notes

Citations

Qing dynasty novels
17th-century Chinese novels